Thomas Vernon Griffiths  (22 June 1894–23 November 1985) was a New Zealand music teacher, lecturer and composer, known for his dedication to music in schools and the community.

Early life and education 
Griffiths was born in West Kirby, Cheshire, England, on 22 June 1894. He spent his childhood in Norwich attending Norwich Grammar School. His father was an Anglican minister who served in poor and deprived areas. He began his working life as a bank clerk before serving as an officer during World War 1. Post-war he won an organ scholarship to the University of Cambridge, graduating with a MusB in 1922.

Career 
From 1922 to 1926 Griffiths taught at schools in Somerset and Canterbury before emigrating to New Zealand in 1926 to become lecturer in music at the Christchurch Teachers' Training College. In 1933, after losing his position at the Training College due to retrenchment, he became music teacher at King Edward Technical College in Dunedin. In both positions he had fostered music making. In Christchurch he instituted group tuition for children in low cost Saturday morning classes. In Dunedin, believing that everyone should have the opportunity to make music, he began orchestras, military bands and chamber groups. All 800 students at King Edward participated in orchestras, military bands or choirs as he believed in the "regenerative power music possessed". Griffiths's programmes for school music were adopted throughout New Zealand schools and his publication, An experiment in school music making, received international recognition.

In 1941 he compiled the sixth edition of the Dominion Song Book and contributed to later editions.

Griffiths graduated with DMus in 1937 and became a professor of music at Canterbury University College in 1942. In 1946 he began the Addington Railway Workshops Choir, which was supported by Bob Semple, the Minister of Works.

He became professor emeritus in 1961 and received an honorary doctorate in music from Canterbury University in 1975.

Throughout his career Griffiths promoted music education, school music and was active in community music. He composed pieces for schools, churches and amateur musicians.

Honours and awards 
In the 1957 Queen's Birthday Honours, Griffiths was appointed an Officer of the Order of the British Empire. The Composers Association of New Zealand awarded him a Citation for Services to Music in 1980.

Personal life 
Griffiths married Daphne Spear in Christchurch in 1944 and they had five children.

He died in Christchurch on 23 November 1985.

Selected works

Compositions and arrangements 
 Missa simplex : in D major (1944)
 Catholic hymn book : melodies harmonised for singing in two, three or four parts; with descants - arrangements (1947)
 A first year course of 12 orchestral exercises or pieces : specially intended for school orchestras and amateur instrumental music groups : orchestral exercise no. 3 : March in D : based on two French folk songs (1947)
 Super omnia ligna cedrorum : for 3 part male voice choir (1950)
 Peace and war : for mixed chorus and brass band (or mixed chorus and pianoforte, or organ) (1956)
 Recessional on 'St. George' : for organ (1956)
 Short suite for organ (1959)
 School songs : for Peter : a boy's song (1960)
 An ode of thanksgiving : for SATB chorus and string orchestra (1962)
 Meditation on Maria zu lieben (1964) - for organ

Books 
 Twenty talks to children on musical subjects : for the use of teachers and training college students (1929)
 An experiment in school music making (1942)

References

External links 
 Peace and War, 1959 recording on RNZ

1894 births
1985 deaths
Academic staff of the University of Canterbury
New Zealand musicians
New Zealand music teachers
New Zealand Officers of the Order of the British Empire
British emigrants to New Zealand